The Human Jungle is a British TV series about a psychiatrist, made for ABC Weekend TV by the small production company,  Independent Artists, for transmission on ITV. Starring Herbert Lom and Sally Smith, it ran for two series, which were first transmitted during 1963 and 1965.

Outline
The majority of the episodes (26 × 50 mins) each focused on one patient, whose psychological ailment Dr Corder would treat using a humane yet idiosyncratic approach that mixed Freudian psychoanalysis with the contemporary methods associated with the then-fashionable theories of R. D. Laing. Several psychiatric techniques, such as word association, group work, role-play and hypnotherapy, were featured in the series. Because of the demands of the 50-minute television episode, it was often suggested that Corder would continue to see his patient after the denouement. Frequently, Corder's initial patient in a story would turn out not to be the character with the pressing mental health issue.

Cast and characters
 Herbert Lom as Dr Roger Corder M.D., D.P.M, who sees patients in his consulting room at 162 Harley Street and at the local (fictional) St Damian's Hospital
 Michael Johnson as Dr Jimmy Davis, junior colleague
 Sally Smith as Corder's headstrong, teenaged daughter, Jennifer, whose mother, we are told, was killed in a car accident
 Mary Yeomans as his secretary, Nancy Hamilton
 Mary Steele as his personal assistant, Jane Harris

Production notes
The series was created by Ronald J. Kahn, credited on screen as "assistant to the producers", and produced by Julian Wintle and Leslie Parkyn.

The theme music was composed by Bernard Ebbinghouse, and arranged and recorded by John Barry and his Orchestra.

Many high-profile guest stars appeared in his surgery or as hospital patients, including Joan Collins, Margaret Lockwood, Flora Robson, Roger Livesey, Rita Tushingham and André Morell.

The first series was filmed at Beaconsfield Studios, which closed down shortly after production ended; the second series was shot at the Associated British Studios in Elstree owned by ABC's parent company Associated British Picture Corporation.

The script editor was John Kruse. The advisor on psychiatric content was Dr Hugh L. Freeman, on behalf of the National Association for Mental Health (now Mind).

Episode list

Series one
Air date is for ABC Weekend TV. ITV regions varied date and order. Episode order is given as per the Network DVD release.

Series two
Air date is for Associated-Rediffusion. ITV regions varied date and order. ABC Weekend Television was broadcast two days later. Order as the for the Network DVD release.

DVD
The complete series was released during November 2012 as a 7 DVD (Region 2) boxset with accompanying series guide by Andrew Pixley.

References

External links
 

1963 British television series debuts
1964 British television series endings
1960s British drama television series
Black-and-white British television shows
English-language television shows
ITV television dramas
Television shows produced by ABC Weekend TV
Television shows shot at Associated British Studios